Čakovec Hydroelectric Power Plant is a large hydroelectric power plant in Croatia that has four turbines with a total nominal capacity of 78 MW (unit A - 38 MW, unit B - 38 MW, unit C - 1.1 MW and unit D - 0.34 MW). Units A and B of the power plant have horizontal pipe turbines and the generators are "in the bulb".  

It is a multipurpose facility harnessing the Drava River water power, providing flood and erosion control, improving drainage, water supply, traffic and conditions for development of leisure industry and sports. Čakovec hydro plant installed power at generator terminals is 75.9 MW, and possible average annual output is 400 GWh. Gross head at the power house for Qi is 17.53 m.

The power plant uses Lake Varaždin as its reservoir and was completed in 1982. It is located near the villages of Šemovec and Orehovica. Although named after Čakovec, the county seat of Međimurje County, the power plant is almost entirely located within Varaždin County, while the reservoir is equally divided between the two counties.

It is operated by Hrvatska elektroprivreda.

External links

Hydroelectric power stations in Croatia
Buildings and structures in Varaždin County
Transport infrastructure completed in 1982
Buildings and structures in Međimurje County
1982 establishments in Yugoslavia
Hydroelectric Power Plant